The Livestock Industry Act 1937 was passed by the Parliament of the United Kingdom on 20 July of that year. The Act was part of a comprehensive proposal for the stabilization of domestic production and prices of beef and regulation by quota of foreign beef importation. A subsidy measure was imposed by tariff levied on foreign beef, while Australian and New Zealand producers were favoured.

The Act was superseded in its entirety by the Agriculture Act 1957.

External links
Information about the Act on Parliament's website

References

United Kingdom Acts of Parliament 1937